

38001–38100 

|-id=018
| 38018 Louisneefs ||  || Louis Neefs (1937–1980), a well-known Flemish singer || 
|-id=019
| 38019 Jeanmariepelt ||  || Jean-Marie Pelt (1933–2015), French botanist at the Université de Metz, founder of the European Institute of Ecology , author of La Cannelle et le panda || 
|-id=020
| 38020 Hannadam || 1998 MP || Hanna Smigiel (born 1971) and her son, Adam (born 1993), are Polish friends of Luciano Tesi, who co-discovered this minor planet. || 
|-id=024
| 38024 Melospadafora || 1998 OB || Melo Spadafora (born 1962), a Panamanian amateur astronomer and member of the Panamanian Association of Amateur Astronomy, who has been instrumental in the setup of the Panamanian Observatory  (Observatorio Panameño en San Pedro de Atacama), in Chile. The observatory does follow-up observations of newly-discovered small Solar System bodies. || 
|-id=044
| 38044 Michaellucas ||  || Michael Lucas (born 1965) is a research associate in the Department of Earth and Planetary Sciences at the University of Tennessee. He studies the geochemical histories of asteroids using telescopic spectroscopy of asteroids and petrology and spectroscopy of analog meteorites. || 
|-id=046
| 38046 Krasnoyarsk ||  || Krasnoyarsk, Siberia, Russia, where in 1772 the German zoologist and botanist Peter Simon Pallas identified a 700-kg stony-iron meteorite, now known as a pallasite || 
|-id=050
| 38050 Bias ||  || Bias from Greek mythology. He was an Athenian warrior, described as stalwart, who fought to prevent Hector from reaching the Greek ships. || 
|-id=070
| 38070 Redwine ||  || Kelley K. Redwine (born 1974), an American occupational therapist in Tucson, Arizona || 
|-id=083
| 38083 Rhadamanthus ||  || Rhadamanthus, mythological son of Zeus and Europa, one of the three judges of the dead in Elysium (together with Aeacus and Minos) || 
|-id=086
| 38086 Beowulf || 1999 JB || Beowulf, hero of one of the oldest surviving texts from early Britain || 
|}

38101–38200 

|-bgcolor=#f2f2f2
| colspan=4 align=center | 
|}

38201–38300 

|-id=203
| 38203 Sanner || 1999 MJ || Glen Sanner, American co-author of the two-volume Night Sky Observer's Guide, and member of the Huachuca Astronomy Club || 
|-id=237
| 38237 Roche || 1999 OF || Édouard Roche (1820–1883), French astronomer and mathematician || 
|-id=238
| 38238 Holíč || 1999 OW || The town of Holíč in western Slovakia || 
|-id=245
| 38245 Marcospontes ||  || Marcos Pontes (born 1963), Brazilian astronaut || 
|-id=246
| 38246 Palupín ||  || The village of Palupín in the Bohemian-Moravian Highlands. It was first mentioned in 1368. St. Wenceslaus church was built by a local landlord in 1617. The family roots of co-discoverer Jana Tichá lie in this village. || 
|-id=250
| 38250 Tartois ||  || Lucien Tartois (1924–2011), French amateur astronomer || 
|-id=268
| 38268 Zenkert ||  || Arnold Zenkert (1923–2013), German author, amateur astronomer, and director of the Bruno H. Bürgel Memorial Plaza in Potsdam, Germany || 
|-id=269
| 38269 Gueymard ||  || Adolphe G. Gueymard (1913–?), American businessman, benefactor of the George Observatory || 
|-id=270
| 38270 Wettzell ||  || Geodetic Fundamental Station Wettzell in the Bavarian Forest, which supplies observational contributions to the International Terrestrial Reference System with satellite radio interferometry and laser ranging || 
|}

38301–38400 

|-bgcolor=#f2f2f2
| colspan=4 align=center | 
|}

38401–38500 

|-id=442
| 38442 Szilárd ||  || Leó Szilárd (1898–1964), Hungarian-German-American nuclear physicist and molecular biologist || 
|-id=454
| 38454 Boroson ||  || Todd A. Boroson (born 1954), American astronomer, deputy director of the National Optical Astronomy Observatory || 
|-id=461
| 38461 Jiřítrnka ||  || Jiří Trnka (1912–1969), Czech graphic artist, painter, puppet-maker, film-maker, author and illustrator || 
|-id=470
| 38470 Deleflie ||  || Florent Deleflie (born 1975) is a French astronomer at IMCCE of the Paris Observatory, specializing in celestial mechanics, dynamics of artificial satellites, and long term orbit propagation. || 
|}

38501–38600 

|-id=540
| 38540 Stevens ||  || Berton L. Stevens (born 1951), American amateur astronomer and discoverer of minor planets at the Desert Moon Observatory near Las Cruces, New Mexico || 
|-id=541
| 38541 Rustichelli ||  || Vittorio Rustichelli (born 1927), Italian telescope maker and amateur astronomer || 
|}

38601–38700 

|-id=628
| 38628 Huya ||  || Huya, rain god of the Wayuu Indians of Venezuela and Colombia || 
|-id=636
| 38636 Kitazato ||  || Kohei Kitazato (born 1980) is a planetary scientist who contributed to JAXA's Hayabusa and Hayabusa2 missions. His research includes physical and chemical properties of near-Earth asteroids. || 
|-id=641
| 38641 Philpott ||  || Lydia Philpott (born 1983) is a planetary geophysicist at the University of British Columbia. Lydia is a member of the OSIRIS-Rex mission to the asteroid (101955) Bennu, where she is a critical part of the team that developed shape models. || 
|-id=669
| 38669 Michikawa ||  || Michikawa is the name of the area in Yurihonjo City, Akita Prefecture, Japan. || 
|-id=671
| 38671 Verdaguer ||  || Jacint Verdaguer (1845–1902), Spanish (Catalan) poet || 
|-id=674
| 38674 Těšínsko ||  || The region of Těšínsko in south-eastern part of Silesia, in 1920 divided between Czechoslovakia and Poland || 
|-id=684
| 38684 Velehrad ||  || The village of Velehrad, Moravia, in the Czech Republic. It is the traditional seat of the great Moravian princes and of Archbishop Methodius || 
|}

38701–38800 

|-bgcolor=#f2f2f2
| colspan=4 align=center | 
|}

38801–38900 

|-id=821
| 38821 Linchinghsia ||  || Brigitte Lin (Lin Ching Hsia; born 1954), Chinese actress || 
|}

38901–39000 

|-id=960
| 38960 Yeungchihung || 2000 TS || Yeung Chi-hung (1953–2010), an avid stargazer since he was a teenager, was one of the founding members of the Hong Kong Astronomical Society. || 
|-id=962
| 38962 Chuwinghung ||  || Chu Wing Hung (Alan Chu; born 1946), Chinese amateur astronomer, compiler of the lunar atlas || 
|-id=966
| 38966 Deller ||  || Jakob Deller (born 1985) is a postdoctoral researcher at the Max Planck Institute in Göttingen, Germany. He studies the formation, evolution, and internal structures of near-Earth asteroids and comets from spacecraft measurements. || 
|-id=976
| 38976 Taeve || 2000 UR || Nickname of Gustav Adolf Schur (born 1931), German cyclist || 
|-id=980
| 38980 Gaoyaojie ||  || Gao Yaojie (born 1927), Chinese medical doctor, pioneer of AIDS prevention in China and winner of the 2001 Jonathan Mann Award for Global Health and Human Rights and of Vital Voices || 
|}

References 

038001-039000